The 2015–16 South Florida Bulls women's basketball team represented the University of South Florida in the 2015–16 NCAA Division I basketball season. The Bulls, coached by Jose Fernandez in his sixteenth season, played their home games at the USF Sun Dome in Tampa, Florida. This was USF's third season as a member of the American Athletic Conference, known as The American or AAC. They finished the season 24–10, 14–4 in AAC play to finish in second place. They advanced to the championship game of the American Athletic Conference women's tournament for the second year in a row, where they lost to Connecticut again. They received at-large bid to the NCAA women's tournament, where they defeated Colorado State in the first round before losing to UCLA in the second round.

Media
All Bulls games will air on Bullscast Radio or CBS 1010 AM. Conference home games will rotate between ESPN3, AAC Digital, and Bullscast. Road games will typically be streamed on the opponents website, though conference road games could also appear on ESPN3 or AAC Digital.

Roster

Schedule

|-
!colspan=9 style="background:#006747; color:#CFC493;"| Regular season

|-
!colspan=12 style="background:#006747;"|American Athletic Conference Women's Tournament

|-
!colspan=12 style="background:#006747;"|NCAA Women's Tournament

Rankings

See also
 2015–16 South Florida Bulls men's basketball team

References

South Florida Bulls women's basketball seasons
South Florida
South Florida